Dara O'Rourke is an environmental scientist, information scientist and professor at the University of California, Berkeley where he holds an appointment in the Department of Environmental Science, Policy, and Management.  He is also the founder of GoodGuide, an online consumer tool for retrieving information about the supply chain of consumer products such as toys, food, and detergents.  Prior to teaching at Berkeley, O'Rourke taught at the Massachusetts Institute of Technology.

See also
 Environmental Science
 Information Science

External links
 - personal website
 O'Rourke's academic website
Miller, Claire Kane, "On Web and iPhone, a Tool to Aid Careful Shopping", New York Times, June 14, 2009
GoodGuide - Ratings of Natural, Green, and Healthy Products  - company website
GoodGuide Wikipedia page GoodGuide

Living people
Environmental scientists
Environmental sociologists
University of California, Berkeley alumni
University of California, Berkeley faculty
Massachusetts Institute of Technology alumni
Year of birth missing (living people)